Roger Aldag (born October 6, 1953) is a former Canadian football offensive lineman who played for the Saskatchewan Roughriders from 1976 through 1992. He was part of the Grey Cup championship-winning Saskatchewan Roughriders in 1989.  Aldag currently holds the Roughrider record for games played with 271 regular season games and 5 play-off games.

Aldag played for the Regina Rams in the Canadian Junior Football League from 1972–1975, during which time the Rams won two National Junior Football Championships (1973 and 1975). He was twice named the Rams Most Valuable Player.

During Aldag's time as a member of the Saskatchewan Roughriders, he was named to the CFL's Western All-Star team 8 times. He twice received the Schenley Award as the CFL's Outstanding Offensive Lineman.  He was also awarded the Mack Truck "Bulldog" award four times.  The Mack Truck "Bulldog" award is voted on by opposing players. 

Aldag was inducted into the Roughrider Plaza of Honour in 1993. He is a member of the Canadian Football Hall of Fame. His jersey #44 was retired by the team, making him one of only eight players so honoured. He was inducted into the Saskatchewan Sports Hall of Fame in 2006. Aldag was voted one of the CFL's top 50 players (#32) in a poll conducted by Canadian sports network TSN.

Aldag was mentioned in the May 9, 2008 "Get Fuzzy" cartoon by Darby Conley.  Satchel notices that Bucky is wearing a CFL hat.  (Although not mentioned specifically in the strip, Bucky is wearing a Hamilton Tiger-Cats toque.)  Bucky replies that all sports in Canada are puck based.  Satchel informs him that football is huge in Canada, and then asks Bucky if he had ever heard of Roger Aldag, since Aldag can't walk down the street in Saskatchewan.  Bucky replies that nobody can walk down the street in Saskatchewan since it is covered in ice. 

On July 1, 2008 Aldag accompanied the Grey Cup to Kandahar, Afghanistan for the Canada Day celebrations.  Members of the Canadian Forces were reportedly thrilled to meet Aldag.

Roger Aldag now works for SaskEnergy in Regina as head of the Land Services department to the delight and humour of his coworkers, who often see his bobblehead figurine around the office.

References

External links
Canadian Football Hall of Fame profile

1953 births
Living people
Canadian Football Hall of Fame inductees
Canadian football offensive linemen
Canadian people of Swedish descent
Players of Canadian football from Saskatchewan
Saskatchewan Roughriders players